Thaï Express (commonly spelled "Thai" Express) is a franchise chain of quick service restaurants serving Thai cuisine across Canada. The Thaï Express brand is owned by the MTY Food Group. In 2009, Thaï Express won the Golden Chain award franchisor of the year award from the Conseil québécois de la franchise.

MTY had purchased Thaï Express from Montreal-based Tara Fung Holding for an undisclosed amount at the time of the acquisition, Thaï Express had six outlets, all of those were franchised and five of which were located in food courts.

Format 
The restaurants are of the fast food type. Customers give their order at a counter, pay and then wait for their food in at counter to be cooked in front of the customer if they enjoy watching; Then they take it to a table if the outlet is a restaurant with seating, or take it away if the outlet does not provide seating. The style of the restaurants is "modern". Generally the colour schemes are mostly white with pale green and pink, as well as wooden textures.

Locations
There are locations in Quebec, Ontario, Manitoba, Alberta, Prince Edward Island, Saskatchewan, British Columbia, Nova Scotia, Newfoundland and Labrador, and New Brunswick, as well as in the United Arab Emirates (Dubai) and the United Kingdom. Most of the locations are counters in shopping mall food courts, but some are sit-down restaurants.

Thaï Express opened its first location in the United States at the Mall of America in Bloomington, Minnesota in May 2017.

See also
 List of Canadian restaurant chains
 List of Thai restaurants

References

External links
 
Menu
Important nutrition facts

Restaurant chains in Canada
Companies based in Montreal
Restaurant franchises
Thai Canadian
Thai restaurants
Fast-food chains of Canada